The history of the city of Bangkok, in Thailand, dates at least to the early–15th century, when it was under the rule of Ayutthaya. Due to its strategic location near the mouth of the Chao Phraya River, the town gradually increased in importance, and after the fall of Ayutthaya King Taksin established his new capital of Thonburi there, on the river's west bank. King Phutthayotfa Chulalok, who succeeded Taksin, moved the capital to the eastern bank in 1782, to which the city dates its foundation under its current Thai name, "Krung Thep Maha Nakhon". Bangkok has since undergone tremendous changes, growing rapidly, especially in the second half of the 20th century, to become the primate city of Thailand. It was the centre of Siam's modernization in the late–19th century, subjected to Allied bombing during the Second World War, and has long been the modern nation's central political stage, with numerous uprisings and coups d'état having taken place on its streets throughout the years.

Under Ayutthaya
It is not known exactly when the area which is now Bangkok was first settled. It probably originated as a small farming and trading community, in a meander of the Chao Phraya River within the mandala of Ayutthaya's influence. The town had become an important customs outpost by as early as the 15th century; the title of its customs official is given as Nai Phra Khanon Thonburi in a document from the reign of Ayutthayan king Chao Sam Phraya (1424–1448). The name also appears in the 1805 revised code of laws known as the Law of Three Seals.

At the time, the Chao Phraya flowed through what are now the Bangkok Noi and Bangkok Yai Canals, forming a large loop in which lay the town. In the reign of King Chairacha (either in 1538 or 1542), a waterway was excavated, bypassing the loop and shortening the route for ships sailing up to Ayutthaya. The flow of the river has since changed to follow the new waterway, dividing the town and making the western part an island. This geographical feature may have given the town the name Bang Ko, meaning 'island village', which later became Bangkok (pronounced in Thai as ). Another theory regarding the origin of the name speculates that it is shortened from Bang Makok, makok being the name of Spondias pinnata, a plant bearing olive-like fruit. This is supported by the fact that Wat Arun, a historic temple in the area, used to be named Wat Makok. Specific mention of the town was first made in the royal chronicles from the reign of King Maha Chakkraphat (1548–1568), giving its name as Thonburi Si Mahasamut. Bangkok was probably a colloquial name, albeit one widely adopted by foreign visitors.

The importance of Bangkok–Thonburi increased with the amount of Ayutthaya's maritime trade. Dutch records noted that ships passing through Bangkok were required to declare their goods and number of passengers, as well as pay customs duties. Ships' cannons would be confiscated and held there before they were allowed to proceed upriver to Ayutthaya. An early English language account is that of Adam Denton, who arrived aboard the Globe, an East India Company merchantman bearing a letter from King James I, which arrived in "the Road of Syam" (Pak Nam) on 15 August 1612, where the port officer of Bangkok attended to the ship. Denton's account mentions that he and his companions journeyed "up the river some twenty miles to a town called Bancope, where we were well received, and further 100 miles to the city...."

Ayutthaya's maritime trade was at its height during the reign of King Narai (1656–1688). Recognition of the city's strategic location guarding the water passage to Ayutthaya lead to expansion of the military presence there. A fort of Western design was constructed on the east side of the river around 1685–1687 under the supervision of French engineer de la Mare, probably replacing an earlier structure, while plans to rebuild the fort on the west bank were also made. De la Mare had arrived with the French embassy of Chevalier de Chaumont, and remained in Siam along with Chevalier de Forbin, who had been appointed governor of Bangkok. The Bangkok garrison under Forbin consisted of Siamese, Portuguese, and French reportedly totaling about one thousand men.

French control over the city was further consolidated when the French General Desfarges, who had arrived with the second French embassy in 1687, secured the king's permission to board troops there. This, however, lead to resentment among Siamese nobles, led by Phetracha, ultimately resulting in the Siamese revolution of 1688, in which King Narai was overthrown and 40,000 Siamese troops besieged Bangkok's eastern fort for four months before an agreement was reached and the French were allowed to withdraw. The revolution resulted in Siam's ties with the West being virtually severed, steering its trade towards China and Japan. The eastern fort was subsequently demolished on Phetracha's orders.

Thonburi 

Ayutthaya was razed by the Burmese in 1767. In the following months, multiple factions competed for control of the kingdom's lands. Of these, Phraya Tak, governor of Tak and a general fighting in Ayutthaya's defence prior to its fall, emerged as the strongest. After succeeding in reclaiming the cities of Ayutthaya and Bangkok, Phraya Tak declared himself king (popularly known as King Taksin) in 1768 and established Thonburi as his capital. Reasons given for this change include the totality of Ayutthaya's destruction and Thonburi's strategic location. Being a fortified town with a sizeable population meant that not much would need to be reconstructed. The existence of an old Chinese trading settlement on the eastern bank allowed Taksin to use his Chinese connections to import rice and revive trade.

King Taksin had the city area extended northwards to border the Bangkok Noi Canal. A moat was dug to protect the city's western border, on which new city walls and fortifications were built. Moats and walls were also constructed on the eastern bank, encircling the city together with the canals on the western side. The king's palace (Thonburi Palace) was built within the old city walls, including the temples of Wat Chaeng (Wat Arun) and Wat Thai Talat (Wat Molilokkayaram) within the palace grounds. Outlying orchards were re-landscaped for rice farming.

Much of Taksin's reign was spent in military campaigns to consolidate the Thonburi Kingdom's hold over Siamese lands. His kingdom, however, would last only until 1782 when a coup was mounted against him, and the general Chao Phraya Chakri established himself as king, later to be known as Phutthayotfa Chulalok or Rama I.

Rattanakosin 

Rama I re-established the capital on the more strategic east bank of the river, relocating the Chinese already settled there to the area between Wat Sam Pluem and Wat Sampheng. (The area is now Bangkok's Chinatown.) Fortifications were rebuilt, and another series of moats was created, encircling the city in an area known as Rattanakosin Island.

The formal date of the city's establishment is the date of the erection of the city pillar on 21 April 1782. (The year would later mark the start of the Rattanakosin Era after calendar reforms by King Rama V in 1888.) Rama I named the new city Krung Rattanakosin In Ayothaya. This was later modified by King Nangklao to be: Krungthepmahanakhon Bowonrattanakosin Mahintha-ayutthaya. While settlements on both banks were commonly called Bangkok, both the 
Burney Treaty of 1826 and the Roberts Treaty of 1833 refer to the capital as the City of Sia-Yut'hia. King Mongkut (Rama IV) would later give the city its full ceremonial name:

Rama I modelled his city after the former capital of Ayutthaya, with the Grand Palace, Front Palace and royal temples by the river, next to the royal field (now Sanam Luang). Continuing outwards were the royal court of justice, royal stables and military prison. Government offices were located within the Grand Palace, while residences of nobles were concentrated south of the palace walls. Settlements spread outwards from the city centre.

The new capital is referred to in Thai sources as Rattanakosin, a name shared by the Siamese kingdom of this historical period. The name Krung Thep and Krung Thep Maha Nakhon, both shortened forms of the full ceremonial name, began to be used near the end of the 19th century. Foreigners, however, continued to refer to the city by the name Bangkok, which has seen continued use until this day.

Most of Rama I's reign was also marked by continued military campaigns, though the Burmese threat gradually declined afterwards. His successors consistently saw to the renovation of old temples, palaces, and monuments in the city. New canals were also built, gradually expanding the fledgling city as areas available for agriculture increased and new transport networks were created.

At the time of the city's foundation, most of the population lived by the river or the canals, often in floating houses on the water. Waterways served as the main method of transportation, and farming communities depended on them for irrigation. Outside the city walls, settlements sprawled along both river banks. Forced settlers, mostly captives of war, also formed several ethnic communities outside the city walls.

Large numbers of Chinese immigrants continued to settle in Bangkok, especially during the early–19th century. Such was their prominence that Europeans visiting in the 1820s estimated that they formed over half of the city population. The Chinese excelled in trade, and led the development of a market economy. The Chinese settlement at Sampheng had become a bustling market by 1835.

Modernization

By the mid-19th century, the West had become an increasingly powerful presence. Missionaries, envoys and merchants began re-visiting Bangkok and Siam, bringing with them both modern innovations and the threat of colonialism. King Mongkut (Rama IV, reigned 1851–68) was open to Western ideas and knowledge, but was also forced to acknowledge their powers, with the signing of the Bowring Treaty in 1855. During his reign, industrialization began taking place in Bangkok, which saw the introduction of the steam engine, modern shipbuilding and the printing press. Influenced by the Western community, Charoen Krung Road, the city's first paved street, was constructed in 1862–64. This was followed by Bamrung Mueang, Fueang Nakhon, Trong (now Rama IV) and Si Lom Roads. Land transport would later surpass the canals in importance, shifting people's homes from floating dwellings toward permanent buildings. The limits of the city proper were also expanded during his reign, extending to the Phadung Krung Kasem Canal, dug in 1851.

King Mongkut's son Chulalongkorn (r. 1868–1910) was set upon modernizing the country. He engaged in wide-ranging reforms, abolishing slavery, corvée (unfree labour) and the feudal system, and creating a centralized bureaucracy and a professional army. The Western concept of nationhood was adopted, and national borders demarcated against British and French territories. Disputes with the French resulted in the Paknam Incident in 1893, when the French sent gunboats up the Chao Phraya to blockade Bangkok, resulting in Siam's concession of territory to France.

With Chulalongkorn's reforms, governance of the capital and the surrounding areas, established as Monthon Krung Thep Phra Mahanakhon, came under the Ministry of Urban Affairs (Nakhonban). During his reign many more canals and roads were built, expanding the urban reaches of the capital. Infrastructure was developed, with the introduction of railway and telegraph services between Bangkok and Samut Prakan and then expanding countrywide. Electricity was introduced, first to palaces and government offices, then to serve electric trams in the capital and later the general public. The King's fascination with the West was reflected in the royal adoption of Western dress and fashions, but most noticeably in architecture. He commissioned the construction of the neoclassical Ananta Samakhom Throne Hall at the new Dusit Palace, which was linked to the historic city centre by the grand Ratchadamnoen Avenue, inspired by the Champs-Élysées in Paris. Examples of Western influence in architecture became visible throughout the city.

20th century

By 1900, rural market zones in Bangkok began developing into residential districts. The Memorial Bridge was constructed in 1932 to connect Thonburi to Bangkok, which was believed to promote economic growth and modernization in a period when infrastructure was developing considerably. Bangkok became the centre stage for power struggles between the military and political elite as the country abolished absolute monarchy in 1932. It was subject to Japanese occupation and Allied bombing during World War II. With the war over in 1945, British and Indian troops landed in September, and during their brief occupation of the city disarmed the Japanese troops. A significant event following the return of the young king, Ananda Mahidol, to Thailand, intended to defuse post-war tensions lingering between Bangkok's ethnic Chinese and Thai people, was his visit to Bangkok's Chinatown Sam Peng Lane, on 3 June 1946.

As a result of pro–Western bloc treaties Bangkok rapidly grew in the post-war period as a result of United States developmental aid and government-sponsored investment. Infrastructure, including the Don Mueang International Airport and highways, was built and expanded. Bangkok's role as an American military R&R destination launched its tourism industry as well as sex trade. Disproportionate urban development led to increasing income inequalities and unprecedented migration from rural areas into Bangkok; its population surged from 1.8 to 3 million in the 1960s. Following the United States' withdrawal from Vietnam, Japanese businesses took over as leaders in investment, and the expansion of export-oriented manufacturing led to growth of the financial market in Bangkok. Rapid growth of the city continued through the 1980s and early–1990s, until it was stalled by the 1997 Asian financial crisis. By then, many public and social issues had emerged, among them the strain on infrastructure reflected in the city's notorious traffic jams. Bangkok's role as the nation's political stage continues to be seen in strings of popular protests, from the student uprisings in 1973 and 1976, anti-military demonstrations in 1992, and successive anti-government protests by the "Yellow Shirt" and "Red Shirt" movements from 2008 on.

Administratively, eastern Bangkok and Thonburi had been established as separate provinces in 1915. (The province east of the river was named Phra Nakhon (.) A series of decrees in 1971–1972 resulted in the merger of these provinces and its local administrations, forming the current city of Bangkok which is officially known in Thai as Krung Thep Maha Nakhon. The Bangkok Metropolitan Administration (BMA) was created in 1975 to govern the city, and its governor has been elected since 1985.

Gallery

See also
 History of Thailand
 Siege of Bangkok
 Fortifications of Bangkok
 Bombing of Bangkok in World War II

Notes

References